Washington for Jesus was a series of demonstrations held in Washington, D.C. by various representatives of the Christian right in the United States. The first rally was held in 1980 on 29 and 30 April and centered primarily on promoting a conservative religious viewpoint in the political arena. Religious leaders present included Pat Robertson, Jerry Falwell, William Bright, and Benson Idahosa.

Although the event was ostensibly non-political, speeches and statements during the 1980 rally outlined many of the early points of the socially conservative agenda of the religious right. It was during this time that many national leaders of the Christian right unified in their political stances against homosexuality, abortion, teenage pregnancy, drug abuse, increasing divorce rates, and the women's liberation movement. The event is regarded as a forerunner of the rise of political activism among conservative Christians, and the rallies are believed to have helped mobilize the religious right behind the candidacies of Ronald Reagan and George W. Bush.

History and rallies 
Washington for Jesus was founded by John Gimenez, the pastor of Rock Church in Virginia Beach, Virginia. Gimenez founded One Nation Under God, Inc. because, he said, he received prophecies that he should go to Washington to influence the future of the United States. Although Gimenez was essentially Charismatic in his beliefs, he was able to appeal to a larger segment of the Christian community with the help of his friend Pat Robertson, who was also based in the Virginia Beach area.

Independent estimates of attendance at the 1980 rally range from 125,000 to 200,000, while Robertson said the attendance was closer to 500,000. The Washington Metropolitan Area Transit Authority estimated that 400,000 trips were taken on the day of the event, which was a single day record, and the first time the system topped 400,000. This broke the record set on 2/26/1980. The record would last more than a year and a half until the pro-union Solidarity Day March.

While Bright argued that the participants had "not come to Washington with a political agenda or to lobby for certain legislation", speakers at the event were explicitly critical of Supreme Court decisions and warned that the increasing acceptance of abortion and homosexuality would provoke God's retaliation in the form of an attack by the Soviet Union. A group of 20 prominent religious organizations, including the National Council of Churches, criticized the Washington for Jesus rally as explicitly political and an effort to "Christianize the government".

During the 1988 rally, President Ronald Reagan addressed the crowd via videotape, describing his plan to make the following Thursday a National Day of Prayer. The National Park Service estimated the crowd at 200,000. The 1988 rally also helped set a single day record for Metrorail, with an estimated 565,000 trips on the day of the rally, breaking the record set by the Redskins Super Bowl victory parade two months earlier. The record would last until the Inauguration of George H.W. Bush in 1989.

The 1996 rally, held in pouring rain, drew an estimated 75,000 people, according to the U.S. Park Police.

In 2012, Gimenez' widow, Anne, spearheaded a two-day rally in Philadelphia called "America for Jesus."

See also

 Christianity and politics

References

External links
"Washington For Jesus Rally", featuring Rev. Falwell. C-SPAN video, 33:00 min, April 29, 1996.

Evangelicalism in the United States
Christianity and politics in the United States
New Right (United States)
Protests in the United States
1980 in Washington, D.C.
1988 in Washington, D.C.
1996 in Washington, D.C.